The Ugandan honours system consists of orders and medals awarded for exemplary service to the nation.

The current awards were are provided for by The National Honours and Awards Act , 2001.

Orders and medals

Republic of Uganda

List of medals of the Republic of Uganda:
The National Independence Medal
The Nalubaale Medal
The Damu Medal
The Luwero Triangle Medal
The Kagera River Medal
The Kyoga Medal

Bunyoro Kingdom

List of Orders and medals of the Bunyoro Kingdom:
 Royal Order of the Omujwaara Kondo
 Royal Order of the Engabu
 Most Honorable Order of Omukama Chwa II Kabalega 
 Medal of Merit
 Medal for Outstanding Contributions
Commemorative Medal

References

External links

Ribbon Bar Diagram, Page 2, Page 3

 
Uganda and the Commonwealth of Nations